Francis Castilion (1561-1638) was the member of the Parliament of England for Great Bedwyn for the parliament of 1597.

His father, Giovanni Battista Castiglione, had been an Italian tutor and later a groom of the privy chamber to Queen Elizabeth.

References 

Members of Parliament for Great Bedwyn
English MPs 1597–1598
1561 births
1638 deaths